This is the electoral history of Jack Layton, the leader of the New Democratic Party (NDP) from 2003 to 2011 and leader of the Official Opposition in 2011. From 2004 to 2011, he was the NDP member of Parliament (MP) for Toronto—Danforth. Previous to his career in federal politics, Layton sat on Toronto City Council from 1982 to 1991 and again from 1994 to 2003, and was the runner up in the 1991 mayoral election.

Overview

Municipal ward elections

1982 election

1985 election

1988 election

1994 election

1997 election

2000 election

Municipal mayoral election

1991 election

Federal constituency elections

2004 general election

2006 general election

2008 general election

2011 general election

Federal general elections 

Layton led the New Democratic Party in four general elections.

2004 general election 

1 Prime Minister when election was called;  Prime Minister after election.
2 Leader of the Opposition when election was called;  Leader of the Opposition after the election.
3 Table does not include parties which received votes but did not elect any members.

2006 general election 

1 Leader of the Opposition when election was called;  Prime Minister after election.
2 Prime Minister when election was called;  Member of Parliament after the election.
3 Table does not include parties which received votes but did not elect any members.

2008 general election 

1 Prime Minister when election was called;  Prime Minister after election.
2 Leader of the Opposition when election was called;  Leader of the Opposition after the election.
3 Table does not include parties which received votes but did not elect any members.

2011 general election 

1 Prime Minister when election was called;  Prime Minister after election.
2 Leader of a third party when election was called;  Leader of the Opposition after the election.
3 Leader of the Opposition when election was called;  not a Member of Parliament after the election. 
4 Table does not include parties which received votes but did not elect any members.

Party leadership elections 
Layton participated in one leadership election: the 2003 New Democratic Party leadership election.

References

External links 
 Library of Parliament:  History of Federal Ridings since 1867

Layton, Jack